The 2013 Women's World Draughts Championship was an international draughts tournament held in Ulan Bator, Mongolia. Sixteen female players in total competed in the tournament, which began on October 4, 2013, and ended on October 15, 2013. The tournament was round-robin style, with a total of 15 rounds played, each of which was a micro-match from two games. Arbiter — Rima Danileviciene (Lithuania).

Competition
The competition began with sixteen players from 10 countries. The players in the tournament were Viktoriya Motrichko, Erdenetsogt Mandakhnaran, Odgejrel Molomjamts, Nyamjargal Numkhbaatar, Laima Adlyte, Darya Tkachenko, Alatenghua, Matrena Nogovitsyna, Ayyyna Sobakina, Heike Verheul, Zoja Golubeva, Tamara Tansykkuzhina, Hanqing Zhao, Olga Fedorovich, Piret Viirma, and Natalia Sadowska. The tournament ended with Zoja Golubeva coming in first place, having won a total of eight matches. Darya Tkachenko came in second place with a total of seven wins.

Also on October 2 the blitz tournament took place (5 min + 3 sec per move) Swiss-system 9 tours – 22 players from 8 countries. Matrena Nogovitsyna came in first place, Viktoriya Motrichko in second place and Darya Tkachenko in third place.

October 3 was the rapid tournament (15 min + 3 sec per move) Swiss-system 7 tours – 22 players from 6 countries. Darya Tkachenko came in first place, Viktoriya Motrichko in second place and Natalia Sadowska in third place.

See also
List of women's Draughts World Championship winners
Women's World Draughts Championship
Mongolian draughts

References

2013 in draughts
Draughts world championships
Sport in Ulaanbaatar
2013 in Mongolian sport
International sports competitions hosted by Mongolia
21st century in Ulaanbaatar